Gwendolyn Sontheim Meyer (born 1961/62) is an American billionaire heiress and equestrian.

Biography

Early life
She is a great-great-granddaughter of William Wallace Cargill, the founder of Cargill. Her late mother was Marion MacMillan Pictet.

Career
A show jumper, she won the Prix Credit Suisse at the Geneva International Horse Show in 2011. She also sponsors dressage.

Personal life
She lives on Coral Reef Ranch in Rancho Santa Fe, California. She is divorced, and has two children. As of May 2022, she was estimated to be worth approximately US$5.5 billion. As of Oct 2022, she was rumored to have a new fiancé. The name of such is unknown to hide the identity of the multi millionaire.

References

1960s births
American billionaires
American female equestrians
American show jumping riders
Cargill people
Female billionaires
Living people
People from Rancho Santa Fe, California
Sportspeople from San Diego County, California
21st-century American women